This is a list of Flash animated television series consists of preschool, children's, and adult animated TV series produced in Adobe Animate (formerly Adobe Flash Professional, Macromedia Flash, and FutureSplash Animator) and Toon Boom Harmony. It is organized by the year of release.

Pre-1990

1990s

2000s

2010s

2020s

Upcoming

Non-Flash shows that utilized Flash

See also
Flash animation
Adobe After Effects
Adobe Animate
Adobe Character Animator
Adobe Flash
List of Flash animated films

References

Flash animated